Kozarde is a village in the Republika Srpska, Bosnia and Herzegovina. According to the 2013 census, the village is located in the municipality of Rogatica and had a population of 18.

References

Populated places in Rogatica